Dipteridae is an extinct family of prehistoric lungfishes which lived in the Devonian period.

Phylogeny
 Sarcopterygii 
 Dipnoi 
 Dipteridae 
 Amadeodipterus 
 Conchodus 
 Dipteroides 
 Dipterus

References 

Prehistoric lungfish
Prehistoric lobe-finned fish families
Devonian bony fish
Devonian first appearances
Triassic extinctions